Zurilaudimakhi (Dargwa: Зурилаудимахьи) is a rural locality (a selo) in Ayalakabsky Selsoviet, Levashinsky District, Republic of Dagestan, Russia. The population was 462 as of 2010. There are 7 streets.

Geography 
Zurilaudimakhi is located 22 km west of Levashi (the district's administrative centre) by road, on the Kakaozen River. Shikshakak and Damkulakada are the nearest rural localities.

Nationalities 
Dargins live there.

References 

Rural localities in Levashinsky District